Dumitru Cipere (born 22 October 1957) is a retired bantamweight boxer from Romania who won bronze medals at the 1980 Olympics and 1981 European Championships. Cipere also won three national senior titles. He took up boxing aged 12 at CSM Severin and after retiring from competitions he worked as a coach there.

1980 Olympic results
Below is the record of Dumitru Cipere, a Romanian bantamweight boxer who competed at the 1980 Moscow Olympics:

 Round of 64: defeated Mario Behrendt (East Germany) by decision, 5-0
 Round of 32: defeated Lucky Mutale (Zambia) by decision, 5-0
 Round of 16: defeated Ryszard Czerwinski (Poland) by decision, 5-0
 Quarterfinal: defeated Samson Khachatrian (Soviet union) by decision, 4-1
 Semifinal: lost to Bernardo Pinango (Venezuela) by decision, 2-3 (was awarded bronze medal)

References

External links
 
 
 
 

1957 births
Living people
Bantamweight boxers
Boxers at the 1980 Summer Olympics
Olympic boxers of Romania
Olympic bronze medalists for Romania
Olympic medalists in boxing
Romanian male boxers
Medalists at the 1980 Summer Olympics
People from Drobeta-Turnu Severin